"Standing on the Top" is a funk song recorded by the Motown group The Temptations, written and produced by (and featuring) musician Rick James.

Background
The Temptations, after a brief spell at Atlantic Records in the late 1970s, re-signed with Motown, in 1980. In 1982, reunited with three of their former lead singers, David Ruffin, Eddie Kendricks and Dennis Edwards , the group, now a seven-piece act,  began a reunion tour. They also recorded a new album together, the aptly-titled Reunion, a collaboration Motown founder Berry Gordy, Motown VP Smokey Robinson and punk-funk star Rick James. The Temptations provided backing vocals on James' 1981 hit "Super Freak".

Details
"Standing on the Top" was released as the lead single from the group's Reunion album in April, 1982. The album version was almost ten minutes long (9:48) and the single release split the track into two halves; "Part 1" was released as the A-side (4:15) and "Part 2" as the B-side (5:33).

Personnel
 Lead vocals by David Ruffin, Eddie Kendricks, Melvin Franklin, Dennis Edwards, Richard Street, Glenn Leonard and Rick James
 Background vocals by Otis Williams, Mary Jane Girls, David Ruffin, Eddie Kendricks, Melvin Franklin, Dennis Edwards, Richard Street and Glenn Leonard
 Clavinet by Rick James
 Bass by Oscar Alton
 Drums by Lanise Hughes
 Guitar by Tom McDermott
 Keyboards by Erskine Williams
 Synthesizer by Levi Ruffin
 "Punk Funk" Horns:
 Saxophone by Chris Powell
 Trumpets by Ken Scott and LaMorris Payne
 Percussion by Nathan Hughes

Chart history
It proved to be one of The Temptations' biggest hits in several years, making it into the R&B Top Ten (#6) and performing well on both the US and UK Singles Chart, peaking at #66 and #53, respectively. In Canada it peaked on the RPM Top 50 at #32 on July 10th, 1982.

References

1982 singles
The Temptations songs
Gordy Records singles
1982 songs
Songs written by Rick James
Song recordings produced by Rick James